The 20th Anniversary is a compilation album by South Korean boy band Sechs Kies, released on April 28, 2017. YG Entertainment announced the development of a new Sechs Kies album along with proper music videos for two title tracks, "Be Well (아프지마요)" and "Sad Song (슬픈노래)", both written and produced by labelmate Tablo.

Background
Following the success of the group's domestic concert tour, "Yellow Note", YG Entertainment announced plans for the development of a new Sechs Kies album to celebrate the group's 20th anniversary (April 15, 2017). The album was revealed to include two new songs, with their music videos, and be released on April 28, 2017. The group also announced the opening of an exhibition related to the group's comeback, called "Yellow Universe", which is open for a month after the album is released.

On April 26, YG Entertainment revealed the track list of the album to the public, which listed all eleven of the songs for the album. The two title tracks, "Be Well" (아프지마요) and "Sad Song" (슬픈노래), along with pre-released single, "Three Words (세 단어)", and eight other classic hits by the group that were remastered and rearranged for their concert tour.

Track listing
Tracks 4-11 are classic hits that were remastered and rerecorded for this album

References

2017 compilation albums
Sechs Kies albums
YG Entertainment albums